Horsetooth Mountain is a mountain summit  in the foothills of the Front Range of the Rocky Mountains of North America.

Mountain
The mountain is easily distinguishable by the large pegmatite rock formation on its summit known as Horsetooth Rock. The formation is a prominent landmark of the nearby city of Fort Collins and often used as a symbol of that city, appearing in the official city seal. The name comes from its distinctive appearance.

The site was previously private property owned by the Soderburg family. In 1982, it was purchased by the county as an "open space" tax acquisition. It is now a popular destination for hikers as well as mountain bikers, with trails leading to the summit.  The summit offers hikers a clear view to the southwest of Longs Peak and Mount Meeker, two rugged mountains in Rocky Mountain National Park.

A daily entrance permit costs $10 per vehicle.

Wildlife
Horsetooth Mountain Park not only hosts some spectacular scenery, it is home to a variety of large mammals such as mule deer, American black bears, mountain lions and coyotes.

Gallery

See also
Horsetooth Reservoir

List of Colorado mountain ranges
List of Colorado mountain summits
List of Colorado fourteeners
List of Colorado 4000 meter prominent summits
List of the most prominent summits of Colorado
List of Colorado county high points

References

External links

Mountains of Larimer County, Colorado
Protected areas of Larimer County, Colorado
Nature reserves in Colorado
North American 2000 m summits